Chüebodensee is a lake above Elm in the Canton of Glarus, Switzerland. Its surface area is 1.4 ha. There are about 8 km of well established trails around the lake. The lake is within the  Glarner Freiberg wildlife preserve.

The lake can be reached from Elm by taking the Elm-Ämpächli gondola to Ämpächlialp and hiking over well marked trails.  The trip from Ämpächlialp to the lake and back will generally take about 4 hours.

References

Lakes of Switzerland
Lakes of the canton of Glarus
LChuebodensee